Sancho Pardo Donlebún, also called Sancho Pardo Osorio, (Donlebún, near Castropol, Asturias,  Spain, circa 1537 - drowned in the Atlantic Ocean, near Lisbon, October, 1607), was a notorious admiral.

Interventions against the Caribbean Pirates
He  participated in the Battle of San Juan (1595).

Pardo's activities near England and Ireland
He took part in the Spanish Armada's planned invasion of England around 1588, and in the Nine Years Anglo-Irish War supported Hugh O'Neill, 2nd Earl of Tyrone.

Pardo's private life
In 1567 Sancho Pardo returned to Spain after 14 years residence in Italy, including missions to protect the Western Mediterranean against the Turkish Fleets and the defeat of the Spanish Fleet in 1560 off the island of Djerba, Tunisia.

He married, Juana Manrique de Lara y Valdés.

References

Further reading

Gran Enciclopedia de España, (2001), Dir. Guillermo Fatás Cabeza, Full collection, 22 vols, 11,052 pages, 
vol 16, pages 7,493-7,996, see page 7,768 

1537 births
1607 deaths
Anglo-Spanish War (1585–1604)
16th-century Spanish people